Tuzandeh Jan may refer to:
 Tuzandeh Jan-e Kohneh
 Tuzandeh Jan-e Now